The Dong-in Literary Award is a South Korean literary award named after novelist Kim Dong-in,  established in order to praise the literary achievement of The Republic of Korea. In commemoration of the Korean modern literature pioneer, Kim Dong-In, this award is given each year to the novelists with short and mid-length works published in the main Korean literary magazines to promote the creativity of domestic novelists.
The award was established in 1955 and is currently run by the Chosun Ilbo. Here are the winners since 1956:

Winners

References

South Korean literary awards
Fiction awards
Awards established in 1955
1955 establishments in South Korea